The Institute for New Testament Textual Research ( — INTF) at the University of Münster, Westphalia, Germany, is to research the textual history of the New Testament and to reconstruct its Greek initial text on the basis of the entire manuscript tradition, the early translations and patristic citations; furthermore the preparation of an Editio Critica Maior based on the entire tradition of the New Testament in Greek manuscripts, early versions and New Testament quotations in ancient Christian literature. Under Kurt Aland's supervision, the INTF collected almost the entire material that was needed. The manuscript count in 1950 was 4250, in 1983, 5460, and in 2017 approximately 5800 manuscripts. 

Moreover, INTF produces several more editions and a variety of tools for New Testament scholarship, including the concise editions known as the "Nestle–Aland" – Novum Testamentum Graece 
and the UBS Greek New Testament. Many of the results are also available to the wider public at the adjoining Bible Museum, which is affiliated with the institute.

History 
The INTF was founded in Münster, Germany, in 1959 by Kurt Aland (1915–1994). Since the 1950s Aland had been working on Eberhard and Erwin Nestle's . At the INTF the concise scholarly edition saw further revisions and publications, until it became the trademark of the institute under the name of "Nestle-Aland" – . In 1966, a second concise edition intended for translators, the Greek New Testament, was published. The great papyri discoveries of the 20th century were of special relevance for a new reconstruction of the text published in both the 26th edition of Nestle–Aland and the third edition of the Greek New Testament. Both editions contain the identical text while differing in their apparatus.

However, the main objective of the Institute was the so-called  based on the entire tradition of the New Testament in Greek manuscripts, old translations and New Testament quotations in ancient Christian literature. The prerequisite for the realisation of this task was the sifting and examination of the entire manuscript tradition of the Greek New Testament.

Kurt Aland found a friend and patron in Bishop Hermann Kunst. In 1964 the latter established the Hermann Kunst Foundation for the Promotion of New Testament Textual Research which has granted crucial financial support to the Institute ever since.

In 1979, Kurt Aland founded the Bible Museum Münster that presents the work of the institute to the general public.

In 1983, Barbara Aland succeeded her husband as director of the institute. Under her supervision, the analysis of the material that had been started under Kurt Aland continued and was made accessible for research in numerous publications. Barbara Aland led the institute until 2004.

Since October 2004  has been in office as director of the institute and the Bible Museum.

Profile 

 History of the textual tradition of the New Testament: it is the task of the Institute for New Testament Textual Research (INTF) to comprehensively document and analyse the history of the textual tradition of the New Testament in its Greek original language.
 List of Greek NT manuscripts: the Institute for New Testament Textual Research operates the international recording list of Greek manuscripts of the New Testament. All newly discovered manuscripts anywhere in the world are being recorded, examined and provided with a short description at the institute.
 Reconstruction of the initial text: the objective is to gain an impression, for the first time based on the entire material available today, of the textual history, and to reconstruct from this the initial text of the New Testament tradition.
 Scholarly concise editions and tools: the INTF tries to answer the need for scholarly concise editions based on the current state of research (Nestle–Aland, Greek New Testament, Synopsis) and scholarly reference works (concordances, Bauer–Aland). The concise editions have been continued, but they have also been supplemented by a digital edition and transcripts of important manuscripts on the Internet and a virtual manuscript room to make use of the advantages of that medium.
 New Testament Virtual Manuscript Room: the INTF provides an electronic text critical resource, the New Testament Virtual Manuscript Room (NT.VMR), a virtual manuscript reading room, where New Testament manuscripts can be viewed online. Digitized manuscripts can be viewed in the VMR individually in facsimile and as transcript, if available.
 : under this title, the INTF publishes its own series. It mainly contains research results and studies from various INTF projects.
 Bible Museum: INTF's outreach to the broader public through the affiliated Bible Museum and through exhibitions outside the institute.

Manuscripts 

Minuscules: 
676, 798, 1432, 2444, 2445, 2446, 2460, 2754, 2755, 2756, 2793; 

Lectionaries: 
ℓ1681, ℓ1682, ℓ1683, ℓ1684 (lower script Uncial 0233), ℓ1685, ℓ1686, ℓ2005, ℓ2137, ℓ2208, and ℓ2276.

See also 
 Kurt Aland
 Editio Critica Maior
 Biblical manuscripts
 Center for the Study of New Testament Manuscripts

Videos 
 TV report (with English subtitles) on the grand opening of the Bible Museum/Münster in March 1979 and the work of the INTF and Interview of Kurt Aland, 1979

Bibliography  
 B. Aland, Neutestamentliche Textforschung, eine philologische, historische und theologische Aufgabe, in: Bilanz und Perspektiven gegenwärtiger Auslegung des Neuen Testaments, hrsg. v. F.W. Horn, Berlin/New York 1995, pp. 7–29. 
 B. Aland, K. Wachtel, The Greek Minuscule Manuscripts of the New Testament, in: The Text of the New Testament in Contemporary Research. Essays on the Status Quaestionis, ed. by Bart D. Ehrman and M. W. Holmes, Grand Rapids, 1995, pp. 43–60.

External links 
 
 Homepage of the Nestle–Aland 28

Biblical studies organizations
Greek New Testament manuscripts
University of Münster
Textual scholarship